The Entrance Bridge is a road bridge that carries the Central Coast Highway (A49) across the Tuggerah Lakes Entrance Channel and joins the towns of The Entrance and The Entrance North, located on the Central Coast of New South Wales, Australia. The 18-span,  concrete girder bridge carries road traffic, as well as a grade-separated pedestrian footpath and cycleway, across Wilfred Barrett Drive as part of the Central Coast Highway.

The bridge is maintained by Roads & Maritime Services, an agency of the Government of New South Wales.

History
Opened in 1934, the inaugural Entrance Bridge was originally a wooden single lane bridge with bypass bays at intervals that allowed traffic travelling in the opposite direction to pass. The original bridge was adequate until 1965 as it only served traffic travelling as far as The Entrance North.

Around 1955, the Number 11 bus operated by Red Bus Services crashed through a wooden retaining wall and landed in The Entrance Channel after its brakes failed while turning onto The Entrance Bridge. The driver and three passengers were uninjured, although the boat that the bus landed on was heavily damaged.

In 1965, Wilfred Barret Drive was opened by the Deputy Premier Pat Hills. The road was named after Councillor Wilfred Barret who was a member of the first Wyong Shire Council. The road continues to be an important link between The Entrance and Toukley, passing through Wyrrabalong National Park.

By the end of 1965 the bridge was dangerous and too costly to maintain. The traffic flow over the old bridge at The Entrance increased to such an extent the structure was under constant repair. Work began on the current two lane, concrete structure on 17 July 1967 after a successful tender by Transbridge. The bridge was opened to traffic on 20 December 1968 and officially opened by Premier Robert Askin on 18 April 1969.

See also

 List of bridges in Australia
 Tuggerah Lakes

References

Road bridges in New South Wales
Bridges completed in 1934
Transport on the Central Coast (New South Wales)
1934 establishments in Australia
The Entrance, New South Wales
Concrete bridges in Australia
Girder bridges
Bridges completed in 1968
1968 establishments in Australia